A data element name is a name given to a data element in, for example, a data dictionary or metadata registry.  In a formal data dictionary, there is often a requirement that no two data elements may have the same name, to allow the data element name to become an identifier, though some data dictionaries may provide ways to qualify the name in some way, for example by the application system or other context in which it occurs.

In a database driven data dictionary, the fully qualified data element name may become the primary key, or an alternate key, of a Data Elements table of the data dictionary.

The data element name typically conforms to ISO/IEC 11179 metadata registry naming conventions and has at least three parts:
Object, Property and Representation term.
Many standards require the use of Upper camel case to differentiate the components of a data element name.  This is the standard used by ebXML, GJXDM and NIEM.



Example of ISO/IEC 11179 name in XML
Users frequently encounter ISO/IEC 11179 when they are exposed to XML Data Element names that have a multi-part Camel Case format:

    Object [Qualifier] Property RepresentationTerm

The specification also includes normative documentation in appendices.

For example, the XML element for a person's given (first) name would be expressed as:

  John

Where Person is the Object=Person, Property=Given and Representation term="Name".  In this case the optional qualifier is not used, in spite of being implicit in the data element name.  This requires knowledge based on data element name, rather than use of structured data.

See also
Data dictionary
Data element
Data element definition
ISO/IEC 11179
Representation term
Semantic spectrum

ISO/IEC 11179
Metadata
Metadata registry